Storm Queen may refer to:
 Storm Queen (horse), a racehorse
 Storm Queen (musician), American musician

See also 
 Stormqueen!, a novel by Marion Zimmer Bradley